Black Ice (UK title A Passion for Murder) is a 1992 film directed by Neill Fearnley and starring Joanna Pacuła, Michael Ironside, Michael Nouri, Mickey Jones, Brent Neale, Harry Nelken, Arne Olsen, Gene Pyrz, Thom Schioler and Rick Skene. The film was shot on location in Winnipeg.

Plot
Vanessa, a beautiful young lady has been having an affair with Eric, a married, high-ranking politician.  She finds herself in deep trouble when Eric suddenly dies after an argument erupts between them and she is forced to go on the run, which means that her affair with Eric was part of her work for a Government agency.  Trouble really begins when her boss deserts her, and her only ally is the taxi driver taking her to safety.

Cast

References

External links

1992 films
1992 thriller films
Canadian thriller films
English-language Canadian films
Films shot in Winnipeg
Films directed by Neill Fearnley
Films about taxis
Saban Entertainment films
1990s English-language films
1990s Canadian films